Richard Harmon Drew Sr. (February 5, 1917 – December 18, 1995) was an American politician who served in the Louisiana House of Representatives.

References

1917 births
1995 deaths
Louisiana lawyers
Democratic Party members of the Louisiana House of Representatives
American Presbyterians
United States Army personnel of World War II
United States Army soldiers
Politicians from Minden, Louisiana
Louisiana city judges
Minden High School (Minden, Louisiana) alumni
Louisiana Tech University alumni
Louisiana State University Law Center alumni
Kemper Military School alumni
Alcohol abuse counselors
Burials at Minden Cemetery
20th-century American judges
20th-century American politicians
20th-century American lawyers